The Ce (Che) language, Kuce (Kuche), is a regionally important Plateau language of Nigeria. It is also known by the name of its native district in Plateau State, Rukuba.

References

Ninzic languages
Languages of Nigeria